Kheyrabad (also Romanized as Kheyrābād; also known as Maḩalleh-ye Kheyrābād) is a village in Kahrizak Rural District, Kahrizak District, Ray County, Tehran Province, Iran. At the 2006 census, its population was 542, in 141 families.

References 

Populated places in Ray County, Iran